Garhani is a village and corresponding community development block in Bhojpur district of Bihar, India. As of 2011, its population was 5,597, in 959 households. The total block population was 103,262, in 16,427 households.

Demographics 
Garhani is a rural block, with no major urban centres. Its sex ratio was 919 as of 2011, compared to the state and district ratios of 918 and 907, respectively. The sex ratio was higher among the 0-6 age group, with 923 females for every 1000 males. Members of scheduled castes made up 17.55% of block residents, and members of scheduled tribes made up 0.03%. Garhani block's literacy rate was 66.77%, which was slightly below the district rate of 69.16%. Literacy was higher in men (79.14%) than in women (53.3%); the corresponding gender gap of 25.84% was marginally higher than that of the district as a whole (25.45%).

Most workers in Garhani block were employed in agriculture in 2011, with 25.70% being cultivators who owned or leased their own land, and a further 54.20% were agricultural labourers who worked another person's land for wages. An additional 3.13% were household industry workers, and the remaining 16.97% were other workers.

Villages 
Garhani block contains the following 51 villages:

References 

Villages in Bhojpur district, India